Koshto may refer to:
 Koshto (album), a 1995 album byAyub Bachchu
 Koshto (film), a 2000 Bangladeshi film